Transradio Press Service was founded by Herbert Moore in 1934. Its mission was to supply news to radio stations by teleprinter and shortwave. The service folded in 1951.

The beginnings 
After leaving CBS in 1934 Herbert Moore, a former United Press reporter, had an idea, why not set up a service to provide copy for radio news broadcasts. At that time many radio stations were limited by the big press services to just two five-minute broadcasts per day and many had shoddy news writing services. Moore was able to raise $150,000 of start up capital and launch the Transradio Press Service in Manhattan.

When the service began it had 50 radio clients and another 75 clients which received limited news by shortwave radio. Some of Transradio's early clients included: KNX in Hollywood, KSTP in St. Paul, the Michigan Network, the Yankee Network in New England, WLS in Chicago and KWK in St. Louis. Transradio charged different rates for different clients, depending on their market. A station in Casper, Wyoming paid only $15 per week while the Yankee Network paid $1000 per week.

In Oct. 1934 Moore managed to work out a deal with WOR in Manhattan for $1500 a week. The deal launched Transradio into the largest radio market in the country.

Transradio's heyday 
Transradio took off, within five years the company had 400 radio and newspaper clients and 600 stringers and reporters worldwide. In fact, Transradio's success was influential over the other big news services, Associated Press, United Press and the International News Service. They all soon realized that they had missed the boat with radio coverage and began to peddle their own news to radio stations. This put the squeeze on the upstart Transradio.

By 1940 Transradio was sending news out to hundreds of stations in the U.S. and Canada, distributing foreign news from France's Agence Havas, Britain's Central News Agency, Germany's Transocean News Service (part of DNB (Deutsche Nachrichten Buro)), British Official Wireless, and its own private sources, including the pioneering foreigncorrespondent Betty Wason, who started the Czechoslovakian bureau in 1938. In 1940 year Canadian authorities expressed their ire with commercially sponsored news, which was outlawed in Canada, when Transport Minister Clarence Howe arose in Ottawa's House of Commons and announced the two sponsored news services in Canada, Transradio and British United Press, must "show their news sources to be accurate," or risk losing their licenses on July 1.

Moore stormed up to Ottawa and claimed there was a plot by "selfish publishing and monopolistic interests ... to destroy independent news services throughout the Dominion." As the licenses were set to expire the Canadian Broadcasting Corporation, whose own unsponsored news came from Canadian Press, reversed the decision and agreed to let Transradio transmit indefinitely.

Herbert Moore left Transradio in 1942 for the publishing business and his brother, Robert Moore, took over as president.

The end of an era 
Transradio folded in 1951 with only 50 clients and 25 staff left.

References

External links
Time Magazine article, Dec. 3, 1951
Time Magazine article, Oct. 29, 1934
 Time Magazine article, July 8, 1940

1934 establishments in New York City
1951 disestablishments in the United States
History of radio
Organizations established in 1934
Organizations disestablished in 1951